Digallate may refer to:

 a salt of digallic acid
 a molecule containing two gallic acid moieties, like Theaflavin digallate